Wilhelmus Johannes Gerardus Maria "Wim" van de Camp (born 27 July 1953) is a Dutch politician who served as a Member of the European Parliament (MEP) between 2009 and 2019. He was the leader of the Christian Democratic Appeal (CDA) delegation, part of the European People's Party (EPP Group), from 2009 to 2014. He was previously a member of the House of Representatives of the Netherlands from 1986 to 2009) where he was active in the fields of education, justice and asylum policy.

Early life and education 
Van de Camp was born on 27 July 1953 in Oss, Netherlands where his parents had an agricultural business. After secondary school, he went to the Higher Agricultural School of Tropical Agriculture in Deventer where he obtained his engineering degree in 1976. He continued his studies in 1982 at the University of Nijmegen where he studied Law.

Career 
Van de Camp started his career as a paralegal in the Association of Dutch Municipalities (VNG in Dutch).

Career in national politics 
Because of his early interest in politics, he joined the KVP-Jo, the youth association of the KVP. Between 1978 and 1981, he was President of this association. He then became Vice President of the CDJA, the youth organization of the CDA which arose in 1981 from a merger between the CSF-Jo, ARJOS and CHJO. Later, from 1981 until 1986, he was a member of the national CDA Party administration..

Van de Camp was a member of the Dutch House of Representatives from 1986 until 2009. In this function, he worked mainly on education and justice. He was also Chairman of the standing committees Home Affairs and Education, Culture and Science.

Member of the European Parliament, 2009–2019 
Van de Camp served as a Member of the European Parliament (MEP) between 14 July 2009 and 2 July 2019. He was the head of the CDA Delegation in the Group of the European People's Party from 2009 to 2014, when Esther de Lange took over as the Dutch EPP-delegation leader. In his role as MEP, he was a permanent member of the Committee on Civil Liberties, Justice and Home Affairs and substitute member of the Committee on Internal Market and Consumer Protection. From 2014 to 2019 he served on the Committee on Transport and Tourism, and was a substitute on the Budgetary Control and International Trade committees. He was also involved in EU-China relations as a member of the European Parliament Delegation for relations with China. He did not seek reelection for the 2019 European Parliament Election.

Life after politics 
Since July 2020, Van de Kamp has been serving as a special advisor on education in emergencies, migration and inclusion to European Commissioner for Transport Adina-Ioana Vălean.

Personal life 
Wim van de Camp is openly gay.

Because of his experience within the Dutch House of Representatives, Wim van de Camp played a prominent role in the guidance of new Dutch Members of Parliament. The 'class of Wim' became a real concept in The Hague. He trained several generations of (CDA) politicians.

In 1998, Wim van de Camp wrote a Party manifesto on safety entitled "Providing Opportunities, Putting Boundaries'. In his text he called for, among other things, the reduction of the criminal liability age from twelve to ten.

Wim van de Camp is an avid motorcyclist. He also brings this passion to his work as an MEP. On 5 December 2012, the European Parliament adopted legislation to oblige the installation of an ABS on all motor vehicles. Wim van de Camp drafted the text for this report. He also expressed his negative opinion on a European Commission proposal that would make annual vehicle inspection mandatory for all motorcycles. According to him, both the direct costs for the rider and the administrative costs would be too high compared to the number of accidents (0.01%) that occur due to poorly maintained vehicles.

Electoral history

References

External links 
 http://www.wimvandecamp.nl/ 
 Home | MEPs | European Parliament
 

1953 births
Living people
Agricultural engineers
Christian Democratic Appeal MEPs
Christian Democratic Appeal politicians
Dutch engineers
Dutch jurists
Gay politicians
LGBT conservatism
LGBT MEPs for the Netherlands
LGBT members of the Parliament of the Netherlands
Members of the House of Representatives (Netherlands)
MEPs for the Netherlands 2009–2014
People from Oss
Radboud University Nijmegen alumni
MEPs for the Netherlands 2014–2019